Wang Yun-wu (July 9, 1888 – August 14, 1979) was an influential Chinese publisher, politician scholar of history and political science; He also invented the Shih Chiao Hao Ma, a method of Chinese lexicography also sometimes referred to as the Four Corner Method.

Career 
In the 1920s when Wang Yun-wu was the editor in chief at The Commercial Press, one of the oldest book enterprises in China, he invented the Four Corner Method. During his tenure, he edited the 4,000-volume collectanea Wanyou Wenku (萬有文庫), the Oriental Magazine (東方雜誌社), and co-curated the Oriental Library (東方圖書館), one of the largest private libraries in the country prior to its destruction by Japanese bombing in 1932.

On May 31, 1948, during the Chinese Civil War, he was appointed by Chiang Kai-shek to lead the Ministry of Finance. After the Chinese Civil War he moved to Taipei with his family. In 1972 Wang Yun-wu presided over the opening of the Sun Yat-sen Memorial Hall in Taipei on behalf of the government.

On August 14, 1987, to commemorate his historical achievement his picture (as above) was placed on the NT$2 Stamp of which 4 million units were printed in Taiwan.

References

External links 

  The Wang Yun-wu commemorative stamp
  Wang Yun-wu presiding over the Memorial Hall's inaugural ribbon-cutting ceremony
Straddling East and West: Lin Yutang, a modern literatus: the Lin Yutang family collection of Chinese painting and calligraphy, an exhibition catalog from The Metropolitan Museum of Art Libraries (fully available online as PDF), which contains material on Wang Yun-wu (see table of contents)

1888 births
1979 deaths
Chinese anti-communists
Chinese people of World War II
Chinese revolutionaries
Commercial Press people
Finance Ministers of the Republic of China
People of the Chinese Civil War
Republic of China politicians from Shanghai
World War II political leaders
Chinese Civil War refugees
Taiwanese people from Shanghai